Hasan II, also known as Fakhr al-Dawla Hasan, was the last ruler of the Bavand dynasty from 1334 until his murder in 1349. He was the brother and successor of Sharaf al-Muluk.

Reign 
In 1344, the Sarbadar ruler Wajih ad-Din Mas'ud, sought to increase his territorial domains, and thus in 1344 invaded the domains of Hasan II and the Paduspanid ruler Eskandar II in Mazandaran with several hostile minor dynasties allied against him. When the Sarbadars advanced on Amol, Hasan decided to abandon the city. He then turned around and defeated the Sarbadar garrison at Sari, cutting off Mas'ud's line of retreat. Despite this, Mas'ud decided to press on. When Hasan attacked his rear, however, and Eskandar II met him at his front, Mas'ud was surrounded. The Sarbadars were decimated, and Mas'ud was captured by Eskandar II. He was handed over to the son of one of Togha Temur's former officials who had died fighting the Sarbadars in 1341/1342. Mas'ud was then executed by the latter. 

In 1349, Hasan ordered the execution of one of his most powerful officials, Jalal ibn Ahmad Jal, who was from the powerful Jalali family which governed Sari. The execution resulted in a revolt by the nobles of Mazandaran. Hasan then tried to get support from another family of Mazandaran, the Chulabids. However, the two sons of Kiya Afrasiyab, a powerful Chulabi nobleman, murdered Hasan while the latter was in a bath on April 17. Afrasiyab then gained control of the Bavandid territories, thus marking the end of the Bavand dynasty and the start of the Afrasiyab dynasty. A son of Hasan managed to flee to the court of the Paduspanid ruler Eskandar II, who later tried to restore Bavand rule in Mazandaran, but failed to do so.

Sources 
 
 

14th-century Bavandid rulers
1349 deaths
Year of birth missing